Emil Triner (born 15 March 1961) is a Czech retired professional rally driver. He drove for Škoda Motorsport in the World Rally Championship in 1993-1997 and 1999.

Complete WRC results

2L-MC results

IRC results

References

External links

1961 births
Living people
World Rally Championship drivers
European Rally Championship drivers
Czech rally drivers
People from Toužim
Sportspeople from the Karlovy Vary Region
Škoda Motorsport drivers